Mytilicolidae is a family of cyclopoid copepods in the order Cyclopoida. There are about 5 genera and 14 described species in Mytilicolidae.

Genera
These five genera belong to the family Mytilicolidae:
 Cerastocheres Monod & Dollfus, 1932
 Mytilicola Steuer, 1902
 Noetiphilus
 Pectenophilus Nagasawa, Bresciani & Lutzen, 1988
 Trochicola Dollfus, 1914

References

Cyclopoida
Articles created by Qbugbot
Crustacean families